Waipoua is a genus of Polynesian araneomorph spiders in the family Orsolobidae, and was first described by Raymond Robert Forster & Norman I. Platnick in 1985.

Species
 it contains eight species, found only in New Zealand:
Waipoua gressitti (Forster, 1964) – New Zealand (Campbell Is.)
Waipoua hila Forster & Platnick, 1985 – New Zealand
Waipoua insula Forster & Platnick, 1985 – New Zealand
Waipoua montana Forster & Platnick, 1985 – New Zealand
Waipoua otiana Forster & Platnick, 1985 – New Zealand
Waipoua ponanga Forster & Platnick, 1985 – New Zealand
Waipoua toronui Forster & Platnick, 1985 (type) – New Zealand
Waipoua totara (Forster, 1956) – New Zealand

See also
 List of Orsolobidae species

References

Araneomorphae genera
Orsolobidae
Taxa named by Raymond Robert Forster
Spiders of New Zealand
Endemic spiders of New Zealand